Suç is a village and a former municipality in the Dibër County, northern Albania. At the 2015 local government reform it became a subdivision of the municipality Klos. The population at the 2011 census was 2,716.

References

Former municipalities in Dibër County
Administrative units of Klos (municipality)
Villages in Dibër County